The Bornean Sun Bear Conservation Centre is a wildlife conservation and research centre for improving animal welfare and rehabilitation of the Malayan sun bear (Helarctos malayanus). It also aims to raise public awareness about the plight of the sun bears and to raise conservation awareness about this species.

The BSBCC was established as a non-profit organisation in Sabah in 2008. It is a joint project between sun bear researcher Wong Siew Te, Land Empowerment Animals People (LEAP), the Sabah Wildlife Department (SWD) and the Sabah Forestry Department (SFD).

The BSBCC is neighboured to the Sepilok Orangutan Rehabilitation Centre in Sepilok and shares veterinary facilities, personnel, parking, access roads and ticket gates.

History
Seeing sun bears kept in dreadful conditions during his study drove the wildlife biologist Wong Siew Te on a quest to open a facility to improve their welfare.

The search for a suitable place unlocked a 2.5 ha site within the 42 km2 Sepilok-Kabili Forest Reserve. The area is adjacent to the Sepilok Orang Utan Rehabilitation Centre and once housed a Sumatran rhinoceros captive breeding programme which stopped in 2006 after the death of the last male rhino there.

The BSBCC started in 2008 with taking over the responsibility of seven captive bears under the care of Sepilok Orangutan Rehabilitation Centre.

In March 2010, the first phase of the structural development of the centre culminated in the opening of a new 20-bear house and outdoor enclosures in the Sepilok Forest Reserve. In April 2010, the existing captive bears were moved into their new living spaces, integrated into 'bear groups' and given access to outdoor enclosures during the day.

A second phase of the project started in September 2010 with the goal to convert the old bear house into offices, a visitor centre and gift shop. It also included the establishment of a quarantine area for up to 10 bears, as well as construction of a new viewing platform and refurbishment of existing boardwalks and trails on the site.

By June 2014, the number of sun bears in the centre has increased to 33. Future developments will involve construction of a second bear house and forested enclosures with capacity for 20 additional bears.

Mission
The mission of BSBCC is neither to be a zoo or merely a tourist attraction, but a centre to improve animal welfare, and for education, research and rehabilitation.
To follow up this objective, it was necessary to create the capacity to confiscate, rehabilitate and release suitable orphaned and ex-captive bears back into the wild. For captive bears, which cannot be released, it was desirable however, to provide an improved long-term living environment.

At the same time, the centre aims to be a strong base to educate the public about the plight of the sun bears, to raise conservation awareness about this species, and to conduct more research on
this species.

Through ongoing research, increased knowledge and awareness, and further protection of habitat, the centre wants to achieve increased protection for sun bears and their habitat.

Facilities of BSBCC

The layout of the centre is divided in three parts, with areas prioritised to visitors, bears and staff members:
Visitor centre, walkways and observation platform 
Outdoor habitat of the sun bears and indoor overnight quarters of the bears
Administrative and veterinary facilities

Bears of BSBCC
Sun bears fall under Schedule 1 of the Totally Protected wildlife species list in the Sabah Wildlife Conservation Enactment 1997. That means, that killing, keeping a bear, or having in possession body parts like claws and gall bladders could result in punishment of up to five years’ prison or a maximum of RM50,000 fine. In the past, a lot of sun bears have been captured from the wild and kept as pets in cages. Actively confiscated by the Sabah Wildlife Department or voluntarily surrendered to BSBCC, the centre is rescuing these captive bears, and giving them proper care and facilities to live in.

Organisation structure
The BSBCC was established as a nonprofit organisation in Sabah in 2008. The board of directors is manned with Cynthia Ong (CEO of LEAP), Wong Siew Te (CEO of Bornean Sun Bear Conservation Centre), Fred Kugan (Deputy Director of Sabah Forest Department) and Augustine Tuuga (Deputy Director of Sabah Wildlife Department). The centre employed by end of 2013 eleven staff members as Centre Coordinator, Environmental Education Officer, Research & Reintroduction Coordinator, General Workers and Animal Keepers.

References

Literature
 BSBCC: Annual reports from 2009 to 2013

External links

 Website of Bornean Sun Bear Conservation Centre
 Wildlifedirect: About Siew Te Wong
 Wong Siew Te: Siew Te Wong's sun bear journal

Sandakan
Wildlife sanctuaries of Malaysia
Animal welfare
Protected areas of Sabah
2008 establishments in Malaysia